Natasha Ann von Imhof (née Rasmuson; born June 28, 1970) is an American politician and was a Republican member of the Alaska Senate. She represented District L from January 23, 2017 to January 17, 2023 and was succeeded by Alaska State Representative Kelly Merrick.  She is the granddaughter of Elmer E. Rasmuson, who was mayor of Anchorage during the 1960s.

References

External links
 Official page at the Alaska Legislature

1970 births
21st-century American women politicians
21st-century American politicians
Republican Party Alaska state senators
American people of Swedish descent
American women philanthropists
Living people
People from Anchorage, Alaska
Women state legislators in Alaska
Harvard College alumni
University of Washington Foster School of Business alumni